Jos Gielen  (26 September 1898 in Rucphen – 6 August 1981 in Beneden-Leeuwen) was a Dutch politician of the Catholic People's Party and literary historian.

1898 births
1981 deaths
Catholic People's Party politicians
20th-century Dutch politicians
Ghent University alumni
Dutch literary historians
Members of the House of Representatives (Netherlands)
Members of the Senate (Netherlands)
Ministers of Education of the Netherlands
People from Rucphen
Academic staff of Radboud University Nijmegen